The UAAP Season 82 volleyball tournaments started on September 4, 2019 with the junior tournaments and on March 3, 2020 for the senior tournaments. The games were played at the Filoil Flying V Centre, Mall of Asia Arena, Smart Araneta Coliseum, PhilSports Arena and the Blue Eagle Gym. The volleyball tournament commissioner is Noreen Go.

Teams
All eight member universities of the UAAP fielded teams in all three divisions.

Coaches

Coaching changes

Men's tournament

Team line-up

Elimination round

Team standings

Match-up results

Game results
Results on top and to the right of the dashes are for first-round games; those to the bottom and to the left of it are second-round games.

Awards
 Most Valuable Player (Season): 
 Most Valuable Player (Finals): 
 Rookie of the Year: 
 First Best Outside Spiker: 
 Second Best Outside Spiker:
 First Best Middle Blocker: 
 Second Best Middle Blocker:
 Best Opposite Spiker: 
 Best Setter: 
 Best Libero: 
 Best Server:

Women's tournament

Team line-up

Elimination round

Team standings

Match-up results

Game results
Results on top and to the right of the dashes are for first-round games; those to the bottom and to the left of it are second-round games.

Boys' tournament
The UAAP Season 82 high school volleyball tournament started on September 4, 2019 at the Paco Arena. Tournament host for the juniors is the Far Eastern University.

Team line-up

Elimination round

Team standings

Match-up results

Scores
Results on top and to the right of the dashes are for first-round games; those to the bottom and to the left of it are second-round games.

Playoffs

Fourth-seed playoff 
(Sep 28) UST def. Adamson 3–0 • 25–19, 29–27, 25–23
(Oct 12) Adamson def. UST 3–1 • 23–25, 29–27, 26–24, 25–22

Semifinals 
FEU vs UST FEU with twice-to-beat advantage.
Elimination round results:
(Sep 14) FEU def. UST 3–2 • 20–25, 29–27, 14–25, 25–23, 15–12
(Oct 6) FEU def. UST 3–0 • 25–16, 30–28, 25–22

UE vs NU UE with twice-to-beat advantage.
Elimination round results:
(Sep 8) UE def. NU 3–0 • 25–20, 25–18, 25–22
(Oct 9) UE def. NU 3–0 • 25–20, 25–23, 25–17

Finals 
FEU vs NU
Best-of-three series.
Elimination round results:
(Sep 28) FEU def. NU 3–1 • 25–21, 30–28, 23–25, 25–16
(Oct 23) NU def. FEU 3–2 • 25–17, 19–25, 22–25, 25–22, 15–12

Awards

 Most Valuable Player (Season): 
 Most Valuable Player (Finals): 
 Rookie of the Year: 
 First Best Outside Spiker: 
 Second Best Outside Spiker: 
 First Best Middle Blocker: 
 Second Best Middle Blocker: 
 Best Opposite Spiker: 
 Best Setter: 
 Best Libero:

Girls' tournament

Team line-up

Elimination round

Team standings

Match-up results

Game results
Results on top and to the right of the dashes are for first-round games; those to the bottom and to the left of it are second-round games.

Playoffs

Stepladder semifinals

Stepladder round 1 
Adamson vs La Salle One-game playoff.
Elimination round results:
(Sep 25) La Salle def. Adamson 3–2 • 28–26, 25–21, 22–25, 7–25, 15–8
(Oct 5) Adamson def. La Salle 3–0 • 25–20, 25–20, 25–23

Stepladder round 2 
UST vs Adamson UST with the twice-to-beat advantage.
Elimination round results:
(Sep 22) UST def. Adamson 3–0 • 25–20, 25–17, 25–17
(Oct 13) UST def. Adamson 3–1 • 25–20, 20–25, 25–18, 25–23

Finals 
NU vs Adamson
Best-of-three series.
Elimination round results:
(Sep 15) NU def. Adamson 3–0 • 25–23, 25–18, 25–21
(Oct 23) NU def. Adamson 3–0 • 25–17, 25–18, 25–16

Awards

 Most Valuable Player (Season): 
 Most Valuable Player (Finals): 
 Rookie of the Year: 
 First Best Outside Spiker: 
 Second Best Outside Spiker: 
 First Best Middle Blocker: 
 Second Best Middle Blocker: 
 Best Opposite Spiker: 
 Best Setter: 
 Best Libero:

Overall championship points

Seniors' division

Juniors' division 

In case of a tie, the team with the higher position in any tournament is ranked higher. If both are still tied, they are listed by alphabetical order.

How rankings are determined:
 Ranks 5th to 8th determined by elimination round standings.
 Loser of the #1 vs #4 semifinal match-up is ranked 4th
 Loser of the #2 vs #3 semifinal match-up is ranked 3rd
 Loser of the finals is ranked 2nd
 Champion is ranked 1st

See also 
NCAA Season 95 volleyball tournaments

References 

UAAP Season 82
UAAP volleyball tournaments
2019 in Philippine sport
Sports events curtailed due to the COVID-19 pandemic
2020 in Philippine sport